Abengourou is a city in eastern Côte d'Ivoire. It is the seat of both Comoé District and Indénié-Djuablin Region. It is also a commune and the seat of and a sub-prefecture of Abengourou Department.

Abengourou is primarily populated by the Anyi ethnic group, a branch of the Akan people who migrated to the region from Ghana. In the 2021 census, the population of the sub-prefecture of Abengourou was 164,424. The city is served by Abengourou Airport. There is also the interior's largest hospital. There is an agricultural vocational training institute, along with a research station that specializes in the local crops of cocoa and coffee.

Within the city is the residence of the Anyi paramount chief, who is also the King of Indénié. His home was built in 1882 and is decorated with artifacts.

The name "Abengourou" stems from the Akan language expression "n'pé kro", which means "I don't like long discussions".

The city is home to the Roman Catholic Diocese of Abengourou, with its cathedral at the Cathédrale Sainte Thérèse de l'enfant Jésus.

Notable people 
 Roger Assalé (born 13 November 1993), international footballer
In 2014, the population of the sub-prefecture of Abengourou was 135,635.

Villages
The seventeen villages of the sub-prefecture of Abengourou and their population in 2014 are:

References

External links 

 
Sub-prefectures of Indénié-Djuablin
District capitals of Ivory Coast
Communes of Indénié-Djuablin
Regional capitals of Ivory Coast